The  was an experimental low-wing monoplane fighter aircraft designed for the Imperial Japanese Army Air Force. It first flew in February 1934, but was never produced for actual use. It was the last Japanese design led by Richard Vogt before he returned to Germany.

Design and development
The Ki-5 was initially produced by Kawasaki Kōkūki Kōgyō K.K. in response to Japanese army specifications for a high-performance fighter to replace the existing Type 92. It was the first all-metal, cantilever monoplane fighter aircraft to be built in Japan. It also had the innovation of using an inverted gull wing design, to improve downward visibility for the pilot and to be able to use a simple, short undercarriage.

However, the Ki-5 design quickly proved unsatisfactory in flight testing.

The project was cancelled on 9 September 1934, after a total of four units were produced. However, the design effort on the Ki-4 later paid off dividends with the designs for the future Ki-28, Ki-60 and Ki-61.

Operators

 Imperial Japanese Army Air Force

Specifications

See also

References

Further reading
 
 Unknown Author(s). Famous Aircraft of the World, no.76: Japanese Army Experimental Fighters (1). Tokyo, Japan: Bunrin-Do Co. Ltd., August 1976.

Abandoned military aircraft projects of Japan
Inverted gull-wing aircraft
1930s Japanese experimental aircraft
Ki-05, Kawasaki
Ki-005